Trofim Kolomiets (1894 – April 1971) was a Soviet Army commander.

Biography 
Kolomiets was born in Elisavetgrad, in the Kherson Governorate of the Russian Empire (present-day Ukraine). He fought in the Imperial Russian Army during World War I before joining the Red Army in the Russian Civil War. At the beginning of the Great Patriotic War, he was a major general. He fought against the forces of the Axis powers at Smolensk in 1941. 

He was then assigned in July 1941 to the defence of Crimea as deputy commander of the 51st Army, of which he became commander in July 1942 shortly after the defeat in the Battle of the Kerch Peninsula against Manstein's troops. 
The remnants of Kolomiets' army were evacuated to the Kuban and assigned to the North Caucasus Front and then, from 1 August 1942, to the southern flank of the Stalingrad Front, which became the Southern eastern front on 6 August 1942. 

Unable to stop the momentum of the 4th Panzer Army, he was demoted in October 1942 to become commander of the 54th Rifle Corps. 
He participated in this position in operations on the Mious, Donbass, around Melitopol, Belarus and East Prussia.

References 

1894 births
1971 deaths
People from Kropyvnytskyi
People from Yelisavetgradsky Uyezd
Communist Party of the Soviet Union members
Soviet lieutenant generals
Frunze Military Academy alumni
Russian military personnel of World War I
Soviet military personnel of the Russian Civil War
Soviet military personnel of World War II